ʻAbd al-Ḥamīd (ALA-LC romanization of ) is a Muslim male given name, and in modern usage, surname. It is built from the Arabic words ʻabd and al-Ḥamīd, one of the names of God in the Qur'an, which gave rise to the Muslim theophoric names. It means "servant of the All-laudable".

It is rendered as Abdolhamid in Persian and Abdülhamit in Turkish. 

It may refer to:

Given name
Abd al-Hamid al-Katib (died 749), Umayyad official and Islamic scholar
'Abd al-Hamīd ibn Turk (fl. 830), Turkish Muslim mathematician
Abdul Hamid Lahori (died 1654), Indian traveller and court historian of Shah Jahan
Abdul Hamid Baba (died c.1732), Pashtun poet
Abdul Hamid I (1725–1789), sultan of the Ottoman Empire
Abdul Hamid (surveyor) (died ?1864), surveyor in Central Asia
Abdul Hamid II (1842–1918), sultan of the Ottoman Empire
Abdul Hamid Halim of Kedah (1864–1943), Sultan of Kedah
Abdul Hamid Madarshahi (1869–1920), Bengali Islamic scholar and author
Maulana Abdul Hamid Khan Bhashani (1880–1976), political leader in Pakistan and Bangladesh
Abdulhamid Bey Gaytabashi (1884–1920), Chief of General Staff of Azerbaijani Armed Forces
Minister Abdul Hamid (1886–1963), former Education Minister of Assam
Abdelhamid Ben Badis (1889–1940), Algerian Muslim scholar
Abdul Hamid Karami (1890–1950), Lebanese politician
Khwaja Abdul Hamied (1898–1972), Indian chemist and businessman
‘Abdu’l-Hamíd Ishráq-Khávari (1902–1972), Iranian Bahá'í scholar
Sufi Abdul Hamid (1903–1938), African-American religious and labor leader
Abdelhamid Abdou (born 1905), Egyptian footballer
Syarif Abdul Hamid Alkadrie (1913–1978), Sultan of Pontianak, Indonesia
Abdul Hamid Khan (general) (1917–1984), Pakistani soldier
Abdelhamid I. Sabra, known as A. I. Sabra (1924–2013), Egyptian-American historian of science
Abdel Hamid al-Sarraj (1925–2013), Syrian soldier and politician
Fouad Abdulhameed Alkhateeb (1925–1995), Saudi Arabian diplomat and businessman
Abdelhamid Mehri (1926–2012), Algerian politician
Abdelhamid Bouchouk (1927–2004), Algerian footballer
Abdul Hamid (field hockey) (1927–2019), Gold medallist for Pakistan in 1960 Olympics
Abdul Hameed (writer) (1928–2011), Pakistani Urdu writer
Abdul Hamid Omar (1929–2009), Malaysian judge
Abdelhamid Kermali (1931–2013), Algerian footballer and football manager
Abdul Hamid (soldier) (1933–1965), Indian soldier and recipient of the Param Vir Chakra
Abd al-Hamid Kishk (1933–1996), Egyptian preacher, scholar of Islam and author
Abdul Hamid al-Bakkoush (1933–2007), Libyan politician
Omar Abdul Hamid Karami, known as Omar Karami (1934–2015), Lebanese politician
Abdelhamid Brahimi (1936–2021), Prime Minister of Algeria
Mohsen Abdel Hamid (born 1937), Iraqi politician
Abdelhamid Temmar (born 1938), Algerian politician
Abdelhamid Sharaf (1939–1980), Prime Minister of Jordan
Abdelhamid Slama (born 1941), Tunisian politician
Abdul Hamid II (field hockey) (born 1942), Silver medallist for Pakistan in 1964 Olympics
Abdul Hameed Dogar (born 1944), Pakistani judge
Abdul Hamid (politician) (born 1944), President of Bangladesh
Abdul Hamid Pawanteh (1944–2022), Malaysian politician
Abdul Hameed Nayyar (born 1945), Pakistani physicist
Molavi Abdul Hamid (born ca. 1946/1947), Iranian cleric
Abdolhamid Fathi (born 1948), Iranian fencer
Abdul Hamid (1948–2022), Indonesian voice actor and puppeteer
Wadgy Abd el-Hamied Mohamed Ghoneim (born ca. 1952), Egyptian Islamic preacher and writer
Abdul Hamid Khan (politician) (born 1953), Pakistani politician
Abdellatif Abdelhamid (born 1954), Syrian film director
Gamal Abdelhamid (born 1957), Egyptian footballer (Zamalek)
Abid Al-Hamid Mahmud al-Tikriti, or Abid Hamid Mahmud (1957–2012), Iraqi military officer
Abdelhamid Halim Ben-Mabrouk, known as Halim Benmabrouk (born 1960), French-Algerian footballer
Mohamed Fouad Abd El Hamid Hassan, known as Mohammad Fouad (born 1961), Egyptian singer
Abdel Hamid al-Ghazzawi (born 1962), Libyan Guantanamo detainee
Abdullah Sani Abdul Hamid (born 1962), Malaysian politician
Ammar Abdulhamid (born 1966), Syrian political activist
Yushau Abdulhameed Shuaib or Yushau Shuaib (born 1969), Nigerian writer
Abdul Hamid Bassiouny (born 1971), Egyptian footballer (Haras el Hodood)
Wazi Abdul Hamid (born 1971), Malaysian motorcyclist
Abdelhamid Hassan (born 1972), Egyptian footballer
Tamer Abdel Hamid (born 1975), Egyptian footballer (Zamalek)
Abdolhamid Rigi (ca. 1979–2010), Iranian executed for terrorist offences
Amir Abdelhamid (born 1979), Egyptian footballer (El-Ahly)
Ahmed Hossam Hussein Abdelhamid, known as Mido (footballer) (born 1983), Egyptian footballer
Abdel Hamid Ahmed (born 1984), Egyptian footballer (El-Ahly)
Abdelhameed Amarri (born 1984), Sudanese footballer
Abdul Hameid Shabana (born 1985), Egyptian footballer
Abdul Hadi Abdul Hamid (born 1987), Malaysian footballer
Abdelhamid Abaaoud (1987–2015), terrorist involved in the November 2015 Paris attacks
Abdülhamit Yıldız (born 1987), Turkish footballer
Mustafa Abdul-Hamid (born 1988), American basketball player
Abdelhamid Abuhabib (born 1989), Palestinian Footballer
Abdelhamid El Kaoutari (born 1990), French footballer of Moroccan descent
Abdul Hamid, known as Bill Hamid (born 1990), American soccer player
Abdulrahim Abdulhameed (born 1990), Bahraini Taekwondo practitioner
Mohd Zabri Abdul Hamid (died 1975), Malaysian policeman
Diwan Bhai Abdul Hamid, Chief Minister of Kapurthala Princely State in India under the British Raj
Abdul Hamid Ali Hassan, Bahraini diplomat
Abdol-Hamid Heyrat Sajjadi, Iranian writer
Abdul Hamid Adiamoh, Nigerian journalist
Ja'far 'Abd Al-Hamid, Iraqi-British film-maker

Family or father name
Dina bint 'Abdu'l-Hamid (1929–2019), Egyptian, first wife of King Hussein of Jordan
Ammar Abdulhamid (born 1966), Syrian writer
Asmaa Abdol-Hamid (born 1981), Danish social worker and politician
Rana Abdelhamid (born 1993), Egyptian-American self-defense advocate 
Sara Abdel-Hamid, known as Ikonika, British electronic musician, producer and DJ

See also
Kolej Sultan Abdul Hamid, school in Malaysia
Abdul Hamid Sharaf School, school in Jordan
Masjid Abdul Hamid, mosque in Singapore
Ottoman submarine Abdül Hamid, constructed 1886

References

Arabic masculine given names
Iranian masculine given names
Turkish masculine given names

ca:Abd-al-Hamid
it:'Abd al-Hamid#Persone